Scott Ryan (born ) is an Australian actor and writer, known for writing and starring in the FX series Mr Inbetween and the film The Magician, which he also directed.

At the 2018 AACTA Awards, Ryan won the Best New Talent award, and was nominated for the Best Lead Actor in a Television Role. He was again nominated for Best Lead Actor in 2019, which he then won. Also in 2019, he won the Logie Award for Most Outstanding Actor.

In 2020, he was signed to the talent agency CAA after actress Helen Mirren and her husband, director Taylor Hackford, urged their Hollywood agent to watch the series who then offered to represent him.

At the 2021 AACTA Awards, Ryan won Best Lead Actor in a Television Drama as well as Best Screenplay for the third and final season of Mr Inbetween.

Awards and nominations 

Australian Academy of Cinema and Television Arts (AACTA) Awards

 Logie Awards

 The Equity Ensemble Awards

 Screen Producers Australia Awards

 Film Critics Circle of Australia Awards

 IF Awards

 Melbourne Underground Film Festival

References

External links 
 

Living people
Year of birth missing (living people)
AACTA Award winners
Australian male actors